George Norman Douglas (8 December 1868 – 7 February 1952) was a British writer, now best known for his 1917 novel South Wind. His travel books, such as Old Calabria (1915), were also appreciated for the quality of their writing.

Life
Norman Douglas was born in Thüringen, Austria (his surname was registered at birth as Douglass). His mother was Vanda von Poellnitz. His father was John Sholto Douglas (1838–1874), manager of a cotton mill, who died in a hunting accident when Douglas was about six. He spent the first years of his life on the family estate, Villa Falkenhorst, in Thüringen.

Douglas was brought up mainly at Tilquhillie, Deeside, his paternal home in Scotland. He was educated at Yarlet Hall and Uppingham School in England, and then at a grammar school in Karlsruhe. Douglas's paternal grandfather was the 14th Laird of Tilquhillie. Douglas's maternal great-grandfather was General James Ochoncar Forbes, 17th Lord Forbes.

He started in the diplomatic service in 1894 and from then until 1896 was based in St. Petersburg, but was placed on leave following a sexual scandal. In 1897 he bought a villa (Villa Maya) in Posillipo, a maritime suburb of Naples. The next year he married a cousin Elizabeth Louisa Theobaldina FitzGibbon (their mothers were sisters, daughters of Baron Ernst von Poellnitz). They had two children, Louis Archibald (Archie) and Robert Sholto (Robin), and Norman's first published book, Unprofessional Tales (1901), was written in collaboration with Elizabeth and first appeared under the pseudonym Normyx. However, the couple were divorced in 1903 on grounds of Elizabeth's infidelity.

Douglas then moved to Capri, began dividing his time between the Villa Daphne there and London, and became a more committed writer. Nepenthe, the fictional island setting of his novel South Wind (1917), is Capri in light disguise. His friends on the island included the opium addict Jacques d'Adelswärd-Fersen.

From 1912 to 1914 Douglas worked for The English Review. He met D. H. Lawrence through this connection.

Douglas's novel They Went (1920) is a fantasy based on Breton folklore.

D. H. Lawrence based a character in his novel Aaron's Rod (1922) on Douglas, which, according to Richard Aldington, led to a falling out between the two writers. Douglas and Lawrence continued the feud through their responses to the memoirs of the American author Maurice Magnus.

In the book Twentieth Century Authors Douglas stated that he disliked Marxism, Puritanism and "all kinds of set forms, including official Christianity".

During Douglas's years in Florence he was associated with the publisher and bookseller Pino Orioli, who published a number of Douglas's books and works by other English authors in his Lungarno series. Many of these books, notably the first edition of Lawrence's Lady Chatterley's Lover, would have been prosecuted for obscenity if they had been published in London. Douglas probably had a major hand in writing Orioli's autobiography, Adventures of a Bookseller. 

Further scandals led Douglas to leave Italy for the South of France in 1937. Following the collapse of France in 1940 Douglas left the Riviera and made a circuitous journey to London, where he lived from 1942 to 1946. He published the first edition of his Almanac in a tiny edition in Lisbon. He returned to Capri in 1946 and was made a citizen of the island. His circle of acquaintances included the writer Graham Greene, the composer Kaikhosru Shapurji Sorabji and the food writer Elizabeth David.

Douglas died in Capri, apparently after deliberately overdosing himself on drugs after a long illness (see Elisabeth Moor, An Impossible Woman: The Memories of Dottoressa Moor of Capri). His last words are reputed to have been: "Get those fucking nuns away from me." The Latin inscription on his tombstone, from an ode by Horace, reads: Omnes eodem cogimur, "We are all driven to the same end".

Sexual assault allegations 
Douglas was accused on numerous occasions of pederasty and child rape. In 1916, British prosecutors charged Douglas with sexually assaulting a sixteen-year-old boy, and in 1917 he was charged with indecent assault of two boys, one a 10-year-old and the other aged 12. Douglas was granted bail and fled the country for Capri, Italy. He was also forced to flee Florence in 1937 following allegations that he raped a 10-year-old girl.

Reception
H. M. Tomlinson, a contemporary of Douglas's, concluded his 1931 biography by saying that Douglas's kind of prose "is at present out of fashion". He compared the writing to that of great English essayists and novelists: to Jonathan Swift's irony and Laurence Sterne's warmth.

Peter Ackroyd describes Douglas's London Street Games as "a vivid memorial to the inventiveness and energy of London children, and an implicit testimony to the streets which harboured and protected their play."

John Sutherland reports that "Douglas's Mediterranean travel writing chimed with the public taste", and that "there was a time when, in smart literary conversations, Norman Douglas was regarded as one of the smartest things going. Part of that smartness was his keeping, for the whole of his long depraved life, one jump ahead of the law."

In The Grand Tour and Beyond: British and American Travellers in Southern Italy, 1545–1960 (which is chapter 4 of The Evolution of the Grand Tour: Anglo-Italian Cultural Relations since the Renaissance), Edward Chaney wrote that "the true heir to the great tradition of the 'pedestrian tour'  in our own [20th] century has been 'pagan-to-the-core' Norman Douglas. Having first visited the south of Italy with his brother in 1888, before he was 30 he had abandoned his pregnant Russian mistress and his job at the British Embassy in St Petersburg and purchased a villa at Posillipo. By then he had also published his first piece on the subject of southern Italy...."

Works
Douglas's most famous work, South Wind, is a fictionalised account of life in Capri, with controversial references to moral and sexual issues. It has been frequently reprinted.

His travel books combine erudition, insight, whimsicality, and fine prose. These works include Siren Land (1911), Fountains in the Sand, described as "rambles amongst the oases of Tunisia" (1912), Old Calabria (1915), Together (Austria) (1923), and Alone (Italy) (1921). Reviewing Douglas's work in Italian Americana, John Paul Russo wrote:

Douglas's early pamphlets on Capri were revised in Capri (privately published, 1930). His last published work was A Footnote on Capri (1952).

In 1928, Douglas published Some Limericks, an anthology of more-or-less obscene limericks with a mock-scholarly critical apparatus. This classic (of its kind) has been frequently republished, often without acknowledgment in pirate editions. A definitive edition has now been published.

List of works
Unprofessional Tales (T. Fisher Unwin, 1901) as "Normyx" with his then wife Elsa FitzGibbon
Nerinda (G. Orioli, 1901)
The Forestal Conditions of Capri (Adam Bros., 1904)
Three Monographs: The Lost Literature of Capri/Tiberius/Saracens and Corsairs in Capri (Luigi Pierro, 1906)
Some Antiquarian Notes (Giannini & Figli, 1907)
Siren-Land (J. M. Dent, 1911), travel book
Fountains in the Sand: Rambles Among the Oases of Tunisia (Martin Secker, 1912)
Old Calabria (Martin Secker, 1915), travel book
London Street Games (St. Catherine Press, 1916)
South Wind (Martin Secker, 1917), novel
They Went (Chapman & Hall, 1920), novel
Alone (Chapman & Hall, 1921), travel book
Together (Chapman & Hall, 1923), travel book
D.H. Lawrence and Maurice Magnus: A Plea for Better Manners (Privately printed, 1924) (reprinted with changes in Experiments, 1925)
Experiments (Privately printed/later Chapman & Hall, 1925)
Birds and Beasts of the Greek Anthology (Privately printed, 1927)
In the Beginning (Privately printed, 1927), novel
Some Limericks: Collected for Students & ensplendour’d with Introduction, Geographical Index, and with Notes etc. (Privately printed, 1928), Atlas Press
One Day (The Hours Press, 1929)
How About Europe? Some Footnotes on East and West (1929, Chatto & Windus, 1930)
Capri: Materials for a Description of the Island (G. Orioli, 1930)
Paneros: Some Words on Aphrodisiacs and the Like (G. Orioli, 1930), essay
Three of Them (Chatto & Windus, 1930)
 Summer Islands: Ischia and Ponza (Desmond Harmsworth, 1931)
Looking Back: An Autobiographical Excursion (Chatto & Windus, 1933), autobiography
An Almanac (1941, Chatto & Windus/Secker & Warburg, 1945)
Late Harvest (Lindsay Drummond, 1946), autobiography
Venus in the Kitchen editor (Heinemann, 1952), cookery, written under the pseudonym Pilaff Bey
Footnote on Capri (Sidgwick & Jackson, 1952)

Douglas in fiction
 James Joyce's Finnegans Wake (1939) makes several dozen references to London Street Games.
 Vladimir Nabokov's character Sebastian Knight in The Real Life of Sebastian Knight (1941) owns a copy of South Wind. 
 Vladimir Nabokov's Lolita (1955). According to Frances Wilson, "Douglas, Nabokov told his wife, was a 'malicious pederast', and as such is surely the model for Lolita'''s Humbert Humbert. Nabokov ensures Douglas a part in the novel: Gaston Godin, Humbert's homosexual colleague at Beardsley College, has a photograph of Norman Douglas on his studio wall...."
 Patricia Highsmith's protagonist in The Tremor of Forgery (1969) rereads a favourite passage of Fountains in the Sand.
 Anthony Burgess's Earthly Powers (1980) makes occasional reference to Douglas.
 Robertson Davies' character John Parlabane makes reference to Douglas in the Cornish Trilogy novel, The Rebel Angels (1980).
 Roger Williams's Lunch With Elizabeth David (Little, Brown, 1999) features Douglas as a major character.
 Alex Preston's In Love and War (2014) features Douglas as a character.
 D.H. Lawrence's Aaron's Rod (1922). According to Richard Aldington's Life for Life's Sake (1941), p. 375 (and also Aldington's Pinorman, pp. 165, 185), the character James Argyle, in Aaron's Rod, is based on Douglas. In Life for Life's Sake, p. 375, Aldington writes that Lawrence's portrait of Douglas as Argyle "was the real cause of the breach between those two and of Norman's anti-Lawrence pamphlet, though the ostensible casus belli was Lawrence's superbly written introduction to the Memoirs of Maurice Magnus...." In Late Harvest (1946), p. 52, however, Douglas writes, "No. The playful caricature of myself in Lawrence's Aaron's Rod is not the reason why I took up arms against him. The reason was that he had distorted the character of a dead friend of mine [Maurice Magnus] whose memory I wished to defend."

Notes

References

 Aldington, Richard (1954). Pinorman: Personal Recollections of Norman Douglas, Pino Orioli and Charles Prentice. William Heinemann Ltd.
 
 Davenport, John (1955). 'Introduction' to a reprint of Old Calabria.
Dawkins, Richard MacGillivray. Norman Douglas. G. Orioli, Florence, 1933 (Lungarno series). Enlarged and revised edition: Rupert Hart-Davis, London, 1952.
 FitzGibbon, Constantine (1953). Norman Douglas: A Pictorial Record. New York: The McBride Company.
 Holloway, Mark (1976). Norman Douglas: A Biography. Secker & Warburg.
 Leary, Lewis (1968). Norman Douglas. Columbia Essays on Modern Writers, Columbia University Press.
 McDonald, Edward D. (1927). A Bibliography of the Writings of Norman Douglas: With Notes by Norman Douglas. The Centaur Book Shop, Philadelphia.
 Meusberger, Wilhelm (2004). Norman Douglas: A Portrait. Edizione La Conchigli, Via le Botteghe, Capri.
 
 
Tomlinson, Henry Major (1931). Norman Douglas. 'The Dolphin Books', Chatto & Windus, London.
Woolf, Cecil (1954). A Bibliography of Norman Douglas''. Rupert Hart-Davis, London.

External links 

Photos of Norman Douglas (in German) 
Family photos (in German)
 
 
 
 
 
 
 

1868 births
1952 deaths
20th-century British novelists
British travel writers
English autobiographers
Capri, Campania
English LGBT novelists
People educated at Uppingham School
English fantasy writers
People from Thuringia
Drug-related suicides in Italy
People charged with rape
People charged with sex crimes
1952 suicides